The Preceramic Period of Belizean and Mesoamerican history began with the arrival of the first Palaeoindians during 20000 BC11000 BC, and ended with the Mayan development of ceramics during 2000 BC900 BC.

Geography 
During the pre-Columbian era, Belize formed part of Mesoamerica. Traditionally, the first-order subdivisions of the latter follow cultural or political boundaries of Preclassic, Classic, or Postclassic civilisations, eg Mayans and Aztecs. The Mayan region of Mesoamerica is one such. It, in turn, is further subdivided physiographically into at least three regions, ie the Lowlands, the Highlands, and the Pacific. Belize lay within the first of these regions, usually termed the Mayan Lowlands.

Climate 
During the Younger Dryas stage, as the Pleistocene progressed to the Holocene epoch, Belize's climate became increasingly warmer and wetter, its expansive savannah fields increasingly covered by dense tropical broadleaf forests, and its low-lying coast submerged by a 10 ft (3 m) rise in sea levels. It is not certain how exactly the first Palaeoindian settlers adapted to such changes, as little Preceramic plant matter has been recovered in the country and surrounding Mayan Lowlands. It has been suggested, however, that the increasing availability of small, freshwater food-sources, eg molluscs, turtles, and aquatic birds, which attended wetter climatic conditions during the early Holocene, may have driven a slow transition away from a diet heavily reliant on large game towards a broader-spectrum or varied diet incorporating various species of small game and aquatic food-sources.

Demographics 
Few skeletal findings in Belize and the broader central Mayan Lowlands have been dated to the Preceramic, resulting in limited understanding of the period's demographics. Remains recovered from caves across the Yucatan Peninsula have been reliably dated to 13000 BC12000 BC, such findings constituting the earliest available evidence of human presence in the Lowlands. Genetic studies of Yucatanese remains, and of Lowland remains generally, have tended to confirm demographic models involving multiple migrations from North and South America into the Mayan Lowlands. For instance, recent genetic studies on Preceramic skeletal remains from southern Belize found common ancestry between these and Preceramic proto-Chichban speakers from the PanamaColombia region, indicating that the latter settled in southern Belize during 5500 cal BC3600 cal BC, and intermixed with pre-existing Palaeoindian residents. Further studies also found common ancestry between this population and modern Mayans, suggesting that later Mayan settlers of Belize intermixed with pre-existing Palaeoindian residents. Generally, however, Palaeoindians in Belize and the Lowlands are not thought to be direct ancestors of later Mayans, the implication being that the latter did not intermix with the former upon settlement.

Technology

Lithic 

Lithic technology during the first part of the Preceramic is characterised mainly by Clovis-style ie fluted lanceolate and Fell's Cave-style ie fluted fishtail bifaces. Bifaces recovered from Belize and the Mayan Lowlands, however, can seldom be reliably radiocarbon dated. A recent exception to this was provided by excavations in Mayahak Cab Pek and Tzibte Yux, rockshelters in southern Belize, which yielded radiocarbon dates of 10450 cal BC10085 cal BC and 8275 cal BC6650 cal BC for one alternately-bevelled biface and three or four possibly Lowe-style stemmed bifaces, respectively. The relationship of these radiocarbon-dated bifaces to others recovered in Belize is not clear. In particular, it is thought that Sawmill-, Allspice-, and Ya'axche-style bifaces may predate the aforementioned ones, but this conjecture remains unconfirmed.

Bifaces seem to have been phased out in most of Belize and the surrounding Mayan Lowlands by circa 6000 BC, with non-bifacial lithic tools replacing them by circa 3400 BC.

In 1983, the Belize Archaic Archaeological Reconnaissance Project (BAAR) proposed a six-phase classification of lithic technology as found in northern Belize. This classification was subsequently criticised and rejected, being described as 'so badly flawed that the resulting chronology has little merit.' An alternative six-phase classification has since been proposed.

Other 
Evidence of Preceramic weaving, eg cordage, sandals, baskets, nets, and bags, has been recovered across Mesoamerica, though not in Belize. It has been suggested that their absence in the country is rather due to poor preservation of organic material, rather than due to a lack of weaving by Palaeoindian settlers.

Subsistence 
The diet of the first Palaeoindian settlers has not been fully elucidated. Faunal remains from Actun Halal in southern Belize suggest these early settlers consumed jute snails, horses, peccaries, common agouti, and spectacled bears. Floral and faunal evidence from the El Gigante rockshelter in Honduras suggests their diet included hog plums, pears, mammee apples, mesquite beans, acorns, deer, birds, turtles, crabs, and snails. Similar evidence from the Santa Marta rockshelter in Chiapas suggests the likely consumption of green tomatoes, craboo, figs,  deer, peccary, rabbits, snakes, iguanas, tortoises, and jute snails, and the possible consumption of cacao and teosinte.

The early settlers are thought to have begun farming by circa 4500 BC, with the practice becoming increasingly common by circa 3400 BC. Floral remains from northern and central Belize suggest maize, cassava, chilis, squash, and beans were the main cultivars, these being increasingly relied upon for nutrition during 3000 BC1500 BC. This increasing reliance on farmed produce is thought to have resulted in forest disturbance, deforestation, and landscape modification.

Sites 

Preceramic artefacts have been recovered mainly from northern and central Belize. Preceramic findings in southern Belize 'had been suspiciously absent' since the 1980s, being limited to a few surface finds until quite recently. Generally, few Preceramic living spaces have been identified in the Mayan Lowlands. Seven Preceramic sites in Belize have been recently proposed as such, ie Saki Tzul, Mayahak Cab Pek, Tzibte Yux, Actun Halal, Caye Coco, Ladyville, and Xunantunich. An additional four have been recently proposed as working spaces, eg as lithic workshops, namely, Colha, Kelly, Ladyville, and Callar Creek.

Timeline

Scholarship 
The earliest work on Preceramic artefacts from Belize is thought to be that of Augustus Pitt Rivers, who exhibited a flint implement for the Society of Antiquaries of London on 2 March 1871, which had been recovered from the country 'some years ago' by a Royal Navy officer. The discovery, however, did not spark much interest, as work in the region focussed on Classic Period sites and artefacts.

The first significant work was that of the Belize Archaic Archaeological Reconnaissance Project (BAAR), begun in 1980. BAAR identified some 150 possibly Preceramic sites across the country, and conducted excavations in nine of these, all in northern Belize.

See also 
 Pre-Columbian Belize
 Lithic stage in the Americas
 Archaic stage in the Americas
 Palaeoindian Period in Mesoamerica
 Archaic Period in Mesoamerica

Notes and references

Explanatory footnotes

Short citations

References

Journals

Theses

Print

Other

External links 

History of Mesoamerica
History of Belize by period
History of the Yucatán Peninsula
Mesoamerica